Deborah Jean Kottel is a Democratic Party member of the Montana House of Representatives. She represented District 20 from 1995 to 1999, and from 2007 to 2011.

External links
Montana House of Mouse - Deborah Kottel official state legislature website
Project Vote Smart - Representative Deborah Jean 'None' Kottel (MT) profile
Follow the Money - Deborah Kottel
2008 2006 1996 1994 campaign contributions

Members of the Montana House of Representatives
1952 births
Living people
Politicians from Gary, Indiana